The 1996 Irish Greyhound Derby took place during August and September with the final being held at Shelbourne Park in Dublin on 30 September 1996.

The winner Tina Marina won £50,000 and was trained by Seamus Graham, owned by the Greenvale Syndicate (consisting of Michael Butler Sr., Michael Butler Jr., Michael McElhatton, Sean Muldoon and Aidan O'Regan) and bred by Lizzie Maher. The race was sponsored by the Kerry Group's dog food product 'Respond'.

Final result 
At Shelbourne, 30 September  (over 550 yards):

Distances 
neck, 2½, 5¾, 1½, short-head (lengths)

Competition Report
Matt O'Donnell had two major challengers in the defending champion Batties Rocket and his sister Batties Spirit whilst Mountleader Peer edged the pair in the ante-post betting after a win in the Febo Champions Stakes and a sequence of nine straight wins.

It was the Christy O'Callaghan brindle Mountleader Peer that showed first recording a fast 30.20 in qualifying. During the first round the 28.70 Kilkenny Greyhound Stadium record holder Spiral Nikita impressed with a 30.10 and Batties Spirit also went well winning in a time just six spots (0.06) slower. Batties Spirit completed three wins in a row with the fastest second round time of 30.17; Mountleader Peer took his record to twelve consecutive wins beating Spiral Nikita in the process.

The quarter-finals produced a sensation which resulted in the disqualification of Executive Jet in one heat and a shock victory for Brickfield Blaze from Batties Rocket in another. Emly Express also won but Batties Spirit lost leaving just Mountleader Peer unbeaten and 13 in a row.

In the first semi-final Mountleader Peer was surprisingly caught after leading, leaving Sir Grand a short head winner over Spiral Nikita and the defending champion Batties Rocket was eliminated. The run of wins for Mountleader Peer had come to an end.  The second semi-final saw Deerfield Bypass claim the win from Emly Express and Tina Marina but Batties Spirit missed out on a place in the final after only finishing fourth.

Rank outsider Tina Marina was first out of the traps and at the first bend Deerfield Bypass tangled with Emly Express at the same time that Tina Marina, and Spiral Nikita clipped each other. Mountleader Peer missed the trouble and was able to gain what looked like an unbeatable six length advantage but Tina Marina and Spiral Nikita both made ground on the leader as the race progressed. The 14-1 shot Tina Marina then caught Mountleader Peer just before the finishing line to win the £50,000 first prize on offer.

See also
1996 UK & Ireland Greyhound Racing Year

References

Greyhound Derby
Irish Greyhound Derby